Sanchita Bhattacharya (born 19 February 1992) is an Indian playback singer, composer and television personality. At the age of 14, this makes her the oldest winner in the Sa Re Ga Ma Pa L'il Champs history as well as the first female winner with public voting. She has recorded songs for films and albums in various Indian languages.

Discography

References

External links

 

1992 births
Indian women folk singers
Indian folk singers
Bengali Hindus
Indian women playback singers
Bollywood playback singers
Bengali musicians
Bengali playback singers
Bengali singers
People from Kolkata
Sa Re Ga Ma Pa participants
21st-century Indian singers
Singers from West Bengal
Indian folk-pop singers
Living people
21st-century Indian women singers
Women musicians from West Bengal
Indian women pop singers
Music of Bengal
Filmi singers
Indian television presenters
Indian voice actresses
Indian women television presenters